Dennis Manaford Whitney (August 15, 1942 – April 24, 2005) was an American robber and spree killer who shot and killed seven people between February 12 and March 5, 1960. At the time of the killings, he was only 17 years old, with most of his victims being middle-aged men he shot during holdups. Whitney died in a Florida prison, where he had been serving a life sentence, on April 24, 2005. At the time of his death, he had been incarcerated 44 years.

Early life 
Whitney spent the first years of his life in Victorville, California living with his parents. It is reported from a young age he got involved in criminal subcultures and wanted to dive into a life of robbery.

Murders 
On February 12, 1960 Whitney entered a gas station in his home town of Victorville. After a brief holdup with an attendant named Jim Ryan, he shot the man to death and netted $30. Whitney then progressed his way to Phoenix, Arizona, where on February 20, he shot to death 55-year-old Ira Lee Hardison and 40-year-old Spencer Frazier hours apart from one another. Whitney stole Frazier's car and drove until it broke down the next day in Tucson.

With a broken down vehicle and stranded 470 miles away from home, Whitney resorted to another gas station robbery, which ended with 27-year-old Glen B. Smith being killed and Whitney pocketing $104. With the money in hand Whitney was able to hitchhike his way across the country until he finally arrived in Miami, Florida on February 24. On February 28, Whitney killed 21-year-old Miami filling station operator Ken Mezzarno.

The next day, On February 29, Whitney killed gas station attendee 53-year-old Arthur Keeler after a brief holdup which netted him $50. On March 2, Whitney wounded 28-year-old filling station attended Jack Beecher, who got away. Beecher would later give a description of the robber. On March 4, Whitney adducted 62-year-old Virginia Selby from a parking lot. He drove her to an enclosed location where he bashed and shot her death with a claw hammer and his gun. Before the murder, it is believed that Shelby put up a fight with Whitney, that left Whitney with two gashes on his hands.

The murders caused a great stir in the Miami public. Police quickly seized to question Jack Beecher, the only survivor of the killer. Beecher claimed the shooter was a young teen age looking red haired male, which matched Whitney's description. Whitney, who was already wanted for questioning for the killing of Virginia Shelby, was arrested on March 5. Whitney confessed to the murders, including the murders he committed in Arizona and California.

Trial and imprisonment 
Whitney was charged with two murders, those being the ones of Arthur Keeler and Virginia Shelby. First spared of the death penalty for the murder of Shelby, On June 28, 1960, Whitney was sentenced to death for killing Keeler. After the verdict was announced at the sentencing, Whitney appeared dazed in his seat, and his defense attorneys later reveled to the public that they were surprised that the jury held up the verdict unanimously.

In 1972, Whitney's sentences were reversed after Furman v. Georgia ruled that the death penalty was unconstitutional, and he was resentenced to life imprisonment. On April 24, 2005 Whitney died in Union Correctional Facility from unspecified causes. At the time of his death, he had been incarcerated 44 years, which at the time was one of the longest sentences to ever be served.

See also 
 Capital punishment for juveniles in the United States
 List of longest prison sentences served

References

External links 
 DENNIS MANAFORD WHITNEY v. STATE FLORIDA

1960 murders in the United States
1942 births
American male criminals
American people convicted of murder
People convicted of murder by Florida
20th-century American criminals
People from North Hollywood, Los Angeles
People from Victorville, California
2005 deaths